Delias caliban is a butterfly in the family Pieridae. It was described by Henley Grose-Smith in 1897. It is found in the Australasian realm where it is endemic to the D'Entrecasteaux Islands.

Subspecies
D. c. caliban (Fergusson Island)
D. c. satisbona Rothschild, 1915 (Goodenough Island)

References

External links
Delias at Markku Savela's Lepidoptera and Some Other Life Forms

caliban
Butterflies described in 1897